Edmund Pendleton Dandridge (September 5, 1881 – January 28, 1961) was fifth bishop of the Episcopal Diocese of Tennessee, serving from 1947 to 1953.

Biography
Dandridge was born on September 5, 1881 in Flushing, Queens, New York City, the son of Lemuel Purnell Dandridge and Isabelle Lawrence. He was ordained deacon in June 1906 by William Loyall Gravatt, Coadjutor Bishop of West Virginia and priest in December 1908 by George William Peterkin, Bishop of West Virginia. He served as rector of Christ Church in Nashville, Tennessee. On April 20, 1938, he was elected Coadjutor Bishop of Tennessee and was consecrated on September 20, 1938 by Presiding Bishop Henry St. George Tucker. He succeeded as Bishop of Tennessee on January 5, 1947. He resigned on September 20, 1953 and died on January 28, 1961. He married Mary Robertson Lloyd on October 6, 1909.

During Dandridge's tenure as Tennessee Diocesan, the diocese grew at a far larger rate than perhaps in any prior period in its history, mainly due to suburban development in the four major cities of the state and the missions and parishes erected to serve them. Growth proceeded to the point that, by the 1980s, the statewide body had been divided into three dioceses, one for each major region of Tennessee.

References

1881 births
1961 deaths
Episcopal bishops of Tennessee
20th-century American Episcopalians